Marcelino Pérez Jardón (23 October 1912 – 1983) was a Uruguayan footballer. He played in two matches for the Uruguay national football team in 1933 and 1935. He was also part of Uruguay's squad for the 1935 South American Championship.

References

1912 births
1983 deaths
Uruguayan footballers
Uruguay international footballers
Place of birth missing
Association footballers not categorized by position